Guilin University of Technology is situated in the city Guilin in Guangxi, China. It currently has more than 19,000 students. At present, it offers 59 undergraduate programmes and 35 postgraduate programmes including Management, Economics, Art, Literature, Engineering, Science, and Agriculture, as well as Chinese language courses designed for international students.

Departments
College of Materials Sciences and Engineering
College of Earth Sciences
College of Environment Sciences and Engineering
College of Chemistry and Bio-engineering
College of Civil Engineering and Architecture
College of Mechanical and Control Engineering
College of Information Sciences and Engineering
College of Management
Tourism School
College of Art and Design
College of Humanities and Social Sciences
College of Foreign Studies
College of Mathematics Science
Higher Vocational Technical College
College of Applied Technology
College of International Education
Bowen College
Nanning Campus
College of Geomatics and Geoinformation

Courses
-Chinese Language Training Courses

Undergraduate courses
BA. Accounting
BA. Administrative Management
BA. Advertising
BA. Animation
BA. Art Design
BA. Business Management
BA. E-Commerce
BA. English Language
BA. Human Resources Management
BA. Information Management and Information Systems
BA. Japanese Language
BA. Marketing
BA. Project Management
BA. Tourism Management
BEc. International Trade and Economics
BEng. Architecture
BEng. Automation
BEng. Bio-engineering
BEng. Chemical Engineering and Technology
BEng. Civil Engineering
BEng. Communications Engineering
BEng. Computer Science and Technology
BEng. Electronic Information Engineering
BEng. Environmental Engineering
BEng. Hydrographic and Resources Engineering
BEng. Industrial Design
BEng. Inorganic and Non-metallic Materials Engineering
BEng. Jewelry and Materials Technology
BEng. Macromolecular Materials and Engineering
BEng. Mechanic Manufacture & Automation
BEng. Prospecting and Engineering
BEng. Resource Exploration Engineering
BEng. Survey Engineering
BEng. Urban Planning
BEng. Water Supply and Drainage Engineering
BSc. Applied Chemistry
BSc. Applied Physics
BSc. Electronic Information Science and Technology
BSc. Environmental Science
BSc. Forestry Resources Protection and Leisure
BSc. Geographic Information Systems
BSc. Geology
BSc. Geophysics
BSc. Information and Computing Science
BSc. Materials Chemistry
BSc. Resources Environment and Urban and Regional Planning Management
BSc. Statistics
LLB. Social Work

Postgraduate Courses
Master of Business Administration
MA. Business Management
MA. English Language and Applied Linguistics 
MA. Tourism Management 
MEc. Industrial Economics
MEc. Statistics
MEng. Applied Chemistry
MEng. Cartography and Geographic Information Engineering 
MEng. Chemistry Techniques
MEng. Computer Applications Technology
MEng. Environmental Engineering
MEng. Environmental Science
MEng. Geodetics and Survey Engineering
MEng. Geologic Engineering
MEng. Geotechnical Engineering 
MEng. Hydrography and Water Resources 
MEng. Materials Physics and Chemistry
MEng. Materials Processing Engineering 
MEng. Materials Science 
MEng. Mineral Exploration and Survey 
MEng. Monitoring Technology and Automatic Equipment 
MEng. Municipal Engineering 
MEng. Natural Calamity Precaution and Protection 
MEng. Structural Geology 
MEng. Structural Engineering
MEng. Terrestrial and Information Technology 
MEng. Urban Planning
ML. Chinese Ethnic Economics 
ML. Ideological and Political Education 
ML. Principle Theory of Marxism 
MSc. Analytical Chemistry
MSc. Geochemistry 
MSc. Macromolecular Chemistry and Physics 
MSc. Metallurgy
MSc. Mineralogy 
MSc. Paleontology and Stratigraphy 
MSc. Petrology 
MSc. Quaternary Geology

Faculty
 

Behzad Barkat, translator and writer, university professor

Partner Institution

Poland
Wrocław University of Science and Technology
Poznań University of Technology

Malaysia
Universiti Tunku Abdul Rahman

References

Guilin University of Technology
Educational institutions established in 1956
1956 establishments in China